is a type of string bag used by the samurai class primarily during the Sengoku period of Japan. Kubi bukuro literally means 'neck bag'. This type of bag was made out of net to carry a severed enemy head. When walking, it is hung it from the waist. When the owner is riding a horse, the bag is fastened to the saddle. Samurai commanders carried many of these Kubi bukuro.

See also
 Kate-bukuro

References
 Turnbull, Stephen (1998). The Samurai Sourcebook. London: Arms & Armour Press. , reprinted by Cassell & Co., London, 2000.

External links
 

Samurai weapons and equipment